In American college football, the longest NCAA Division I winning streak is held by the Oklahoma Sooners, who won 47 consecutive games between 1953 and 1957. The longest FCS winning streak is held by the North Dakota State Bison, who had a winning streak of 39 consecutive wins between 2017 and 2021.

NCAA Division I Football Bowl Subdivision
The following is a list of the longest winning streaks in NCAA Division I FBS of 25 games or more through the 2019 season.

^ Streak was part of Division I's longest unbeaten streak of 64 games (60–0–4) between 1907 and 1917.
† Indicates a streak ended by a tie.
‡ Indicates a streak ended in a bowl game.
# Indicates a streak ended in CFP National Championship.

(USC initially had a 34 game winning streak from 2003 to 2005, of which 14 of those wins were later vacated by the NCAA.)

NCAA Division I Football Championship Subdivision

The following is a list of the longest winning streaks in NCAA Division I FCS. Only schools that have been FCS members for five years are eligible for inclusion.

 tie ended the winning streak

References

Lists of college football team records